Ganna Sorokina (born 31 March 1976 in Zaporizhzhia) is a Ukrainian diver.

Career
She won the bronze medal with Olena Zhupina in the Women's 3m Synchronized Springboard competition. Sorokina also competed in the individual 3m Springboard competitions at the 2000 Summer Olympics and the 2004 Summer Olympics. Ganna took 11th place at the 2000 Olympics with a score of 512.97 and a 16th-place finish for the 2004 Athens Games.

References

 http://hosted.ap.org/dynamic/files/olympics/2004/DVW001.html?SITE=DCWAP2&SECTION=OLYMPICS
 http://assets.espn.go.com/oly/summer00/results/diving.html

1976 births
Living people
Ukrainian female divers
Olympic divers of Ukraine
Divers at the 2000 Summer Olympics
Divers at the 2004 Summer Olympics
Olympic bronze medalists for Ukraine
Sportspeople from Zaporizhzhia
Olympic medalists in diving
Medalists at the 2000 Summer Olympics
Universiade medalists in diving
Universiade silver medalists for Ukraine
Medalists at the 2001 Summer Universiade